This page is a list of various individuals who are multiple Olympic medalists at the Summer Olympics.

List of multiple Summer Olympic medalists
This list shows only the athletes who have won at least eight medals at the Summer Olympics.

Most medals in one individual event
This list shows only the athletes who have won at least four medals in the same individual event at the Summer Olympics.

See also
 List of multiple Winter Olympic medalists
 List of multiple Olympic medalists
 List of multiple Olympic medalists at a single Games
 List of multiple Olympic medalists in one event
 List of athletes with the most appearances at Olympic Games

Olympic Games medal tables